Chanderi Assembly constituency is one of the 230 Vidhan Sabha (Legislative Assembly) constituencies of Madhya Pradesh state in central India. This constituency came into existence in 2008, following the delimitation of the Legislative Assembly constituencies.

Overview
Chanderi (constituency number 33) is one of the 3 Vidhan Sabha constituencies located in Ashok Nagar district. This constituency covers the entire Isagarh tehsil, entire Naisarai tehsil and part of Chanderi tehsil of the Ashoknagar district.

Chanderi is part of Guna Lok Sabha constituency along with seven other namely, Ashok Nagar and Mungaoli in  Ashoknagar district, Bamori and Guna in Guna district, Shivpuri, Pichhore and Kolaras in Shivpuri district.

Members of Legislative Assembly

Election Results

2018 results

Source:

See also
 Chanderi
 Isagarh

References

Ashoknagar district
Assembly constituencies of Madhya Pradesh